Maison Dieu ('House of God') is a hospital, monastery, hostel, retirement home and royal lodge commissioned by Henry III in 1234.
The timber framed building is located beside Watling Street, now the A2 road, in Ospringe, Faversham, in Kent, England.

Edward Hasted noted in 1798 that it was dedicated to the Virgin Mary. The foundation consisted of a master and three regular brethren of the Order of the Holy Cross. There were also two secular clerks, who celebrated mass for the soul of the founder and the souls of his royal predecessors and successors. They were required to be hospitable, and to entertain the poor and needy passers-by and pilgrims (heading along Watling Street). There was a chamber in the building which the king used to rest when he passed this way; it was called Camera Regis, or the king's chamber. The history and records of the building also give insight into the way sick and disabled people fitted into society during the medieval period. For example, in 1235 the 'blind daughter of Andrew of Faversham' was admitted to Maison Dieu as a 'servant of God and sister of the hospital'.

Timeline

Currently
It is under the guardianship of English Heritage and managed by the Maison Dieu Museum Trust. Currently it is used to display Roman artefacts from the surrounding area including the ruined 'Church of Our Lady of Elwarton' in Stone. but is only open at weekends and Bank Holidays from Good Friday to October.

References

External links
Maison Dieu page at English Heritage
The Maison Dieu Museum Trust official website

English Heritage sites in Kent
Museums in the Borough of Swale
Archaeological museums in England
Museums of ancient Rome in the United Kingdom
1234 establishments in England
Timber framed buildings in England
Buildings and structures in Faversham